The Third Millennium John Paul II Bridge is a  cable-stayed road bridge which spans the Martwa Wisła River in Gdańsk, Poland.

The bridge forms an inverted “Y”-shape with a 100-metre-tall pylon. Until Rędziński Bridge was opened on the 31 August 2011, it used to be the longest cable-stayed bridge in Poland supported by a single pylon.

The bridge links the Northern Port of Gdańsk with the national road network and is the first section of the future by-pass road of the city of Gdańsk.

References

External links
 Third Millennium John Paul II Bridge in Structurae database

Bridges in Gdańsk
Road bridges in Poland
Cable-stayed bridges in Poland
Bridges completed in 2001
Buildings and structures celebrating the third millennium
Pope John Paul II